Reverend Maceo Len Woods (April 23, 1932 – January 11, 2020), was an American gospel musician and noted organist, who founded, Christian Tabernacle Church. He started his music career, in 1954, with the release of, Amazing Grace, that was released by Vee-Jay Records. His 25 releases have spanned the course of 50 plus years in recording music, and he has released albums with a myriad of noteworthy labels including; Vee-Jay Records, Volt Records, Arista Records, P-Vine Records, and Stax Records. The only work to place upon the Billboard magazine R&B Albums chart, with the release of Hello Sunshine in 1970 with Volt Records, and the song "Hello Sunshine" placed on the R&B Singles chart.

Early life
Reverend Woods was born on April 23, 1932 in Chicago, Illinois as Maceo Len Woods, and he is a celebrated organist, who founded Christian Tabernacle Church that is located on Prairie Avenue in Chicago.

Music career
He started his recording music career in 1954, with the release of Amazing Grace by Vee-Jay Records, and it sold more than 200,000 copies. His only album to place on a Billboard magazine chart was Hello Sunshine that Volt Records released in 1970. This album placed at No. 45 on the R&B Albums chart at No. 45, and the song "Hello Sunshine" was No. 28 on the R&B Singles chart. He has released 25 albums with some noteworthy labels including; Vee-Jay Records, Volt Records, Arista Records, P-Vine Records, and Stax Records.

Discography

References

External links
 Cross Rhythms artist profile

1932 births
2020 deaths
African-American songwriters
African-American Christians
Musicians from Chicago
Songwriters from Illinois
Arista Records artists
Stax Records artists
Vee-Jay Records artists
21st-century African-American people